The Yesvantpur–Kannur Express is an Express train belonging to South Western Railway zone that runs between Yesvantpur (Bangalore) and  in India. It is currently being operated with 16527/16528 train numbers on a daily basis.

Service
The 16527/Yesvantpur–Kannur Express has an average speed of 50 km/hr and covers 660 km in 13h 20m. The 16528/Kannur–Yesvantpur Express has an average speed of 50 km/hr and covers 660 km in 13h 55m. It is hauled by a WDM-3D based in Diesel Loco Shed, Erode. Train number 16512/16513 runs on this route. Due to the COVID-19 pandemic, it is running as 07389(to Kannur) and 07390(from Kannur). The regular service, 16527/28, was restored on Nov 26, 2021.

Route and halts 

The important halts of the train are:

 
 
 Karmelaram

Coach composition

The train has standard LHB rakes with a max speed of 130 kmph yet the train's maximum speed is limited to 110 kmph due to the restrictions in the route. The train consists of 21 coaches:

 1 AC II Tier
 3 AC III Tier
 13 Sleeper coaches
 2 General
 2 Generators cum Luggage/parcel van

Incidents 

On 12 November 2021, at least 7 coaches of the train, operating as 07390/Kannur-Yesvantpur Special, derailed after boulders fell on it, between Sivadi and Muthampatti, along the Omalur-Bengaluru section, as a result of heavy rain and wind. All 2,348 passengers on board escaped unhurt.

See also 

 Yesvantpur Junction railway station
 Kannur railway station
 Bangalore City–Kannur Express

Notes

References

External links 

 16527/Yesvantpur - Kannur Express India Rail Info
 16528/Kannur - Yesvantpur Express India Rail Info
 07389/Yesvantpur-Kannur Special India Rail Info
  Times of India

Transport in Kannur
Transport in Bangalore
Express trains in India
Rail transport in Kerala
Rail transport in Karnataka
Railway services introduced in 2001